The mottled flowerpecker or white-mottled flowerpecker (Dicaeum tristrami) is a species of bird in the family Dicaeidae. It is endemic to Makira in the Solomon Islands. It inhabits primary forest and secondary growth, most commonly in the mountains.

References

mottled flowerpecker
Birds of Makira
Endemic fauna of the Solomon Islands
mottled flowerpecker
Taxonomy articles created by Polbot
Endemic birds of the Solomon Islands